Jonathan Alan Denning (born March 14, 1987) is an American NASCAR driver.

In 2009, Jon left his NASCAR career to continue his education.  On April 29, 2012, Jon was inducted into the National Jewish Sports Hall of Fame and Museum and is the only person to have done so in the "Auto Racing" category.

College career
Jon graduated from Stevens Institute of Technology in May 2012 with high honors with a Bachelor of Science in Business and Technology and a minor in Economics.

References

1987 births
Living people
Jewish American sportspeople
NASCAR drivers
People from Springfield Township, Union County, New Jersey
Racing drivers from New Jersey
Stevens Institute of Technology alumni
Sportspeople from the New York metropolitan area
21st-century American Jews